The Santander blind snake (Trilepida nicefori) is a species of snake in the family Leptotyphlopidae. The species is endemic to Colombia.

Etymology
The specific name, nicefori, is in honor of missionary Brother Nicéforo María (1888–1980), born Antoine Rouhaire in France, who established a natural history museum in Medellin, Colombia.

Geographic range
T. nicefori is known only from Santander Department, Colombia.

Description
T. nicefori is a very small snake. It is uniform brown dorsally, and beige ventrally.

Reproduction
T. nicefori is oviparous.

References

Further reading
Adalsteinsson SA, Branch WR, Trape S, Vitt LJ, Hedges SB (2009). "Molecular phylogeny, classification, and biogeography of snakes of the family Leptotyphlopidae (Reptilia, Squamata)". Zootaxa 2244: 1-50. (Rena nicefori, new combination).
Dunn ER (1946). "A New Snake from the Eastern Andes of Colombia". Caldasia 4 (17): 121–122. (Leptotyphlops nicefori, new species).
Hedges SB (2011). "The type species of the threadsnake genus Tricheilostoma Jan revisited (Squamata, Leptotyphlopidae)". Zootaxa 3027: 63–64. (Trilepida nicefori, new combination, p. 63).
Pinto, Roberta Richard; Passos, Paulo; Portilla, José Rances Caicedo; Arrendondo, Juan Camilo; Fernandes, Ronaldo (2010). "Taxonomy of the threadsnakes of the tribe Epictini (Squamata: Serpentes: Leptotyphlopidae) in Colombia". Zootaxa 2724: 1-28. (Tricheilostoma nicefori, new combination).

Trilepida
Reptiles of Colombia
Reptiles described in 1946